WMIZ (1270 AM) is a radio station broadcasting a Spanish Tropical format. Licensed to Vineland, New Jersey, United States, the station is currently owned by Clear Communications, Inc.

History
This station was originally known as WDVL. It changed its call letters to WFHM on August 15, 1986. WFHM operated with a talk format. The current WMIZ call letters were granted on December 21, 1990.

References

External links

Cumberland County, New Jersey
MIZ